Wheat whiskey is a style of whiskey defined by having a grain bill which consists primarily of wheat. The United States government only allows a product to be labeled "wheat whiskey" when the mash is composed of at least 51% wheat. Like other American styles, a wheat whiskey may be labelled as a "straight" if it is aged for at least two years in new, charred oak barrels. As of 2022, only a handful of straight wheat whiskey are mass marketed, including Bernheim Original, Middle West, Old Elk, and Dry 
Fly. Some microdistilleries are in production of wheat whiskeys, but are made on a small scale.

There are many examples of wheat whiskeys in the German whisky industry.

While not true wheat whiskeys, some bourbon whiskeys are "wheated"; that is they use a certain percentage of wheat in their mashbills instead of (or complimentary to) the more common rye. Such brands include Cabin Still, Maker's Mark, Old Fitzgerald, Pappy Van Winkle's Family Reserve, Rebel Yell, and W. L. Weller.

See also
 Outline of whisky

References

Whisky